The Oyogos Yar Coast is a coastal area in Sakha, found in northeast Siberia and part of the Russian Far East. It is located near the Laptev Sea.

In 2010, the local people of Yukagir, a village near the coast, found a well-preserved woolly mammoth carcass. The specimen was nicknamed Yuka.

References

Coasts of Russia
Laptev Sea